Trichromia cucufas is a moth in the family Erebidae. It was described by William Schaus in 1924. It is found in French Guiana, Guyana and Bolivia.

References

Moths described in 1924
cucufas